Dumesnil (also known as Louis Gaulard Dumesny) (fl. 1677–1700, died 1702) was a French operatic tenor.  His surname is sometimes found spelt Duménil, Dumény, du Mény, or Du Mesny.

Little is known about Dumesnil's early life, legend has it that he was working as a cook when Jean-Baptiste Lully heard him singing and was impressed by his natural and well focused voice, his vocal range
was then known as haute-contre.

He made his stage debut in 1677, singing a small part in Isis, and then went on creating all roles within his range in a series of operas by Lully. After Lully's death he created several other roles in operas by different composers, notably Pascal Collasse, Marc-Antoine Charpentier, André Campra, and André Cardinal Destouches.

An excellent actor with a powerful voice, he seemed to have learned all his roles by memory as he did not know how to read music. Reputed as a libertine, and for his dispute with La Maupin.

Roles created
 1682: The title role in Persée by Lully
 1684: The title role in Amadis by Lully
 1686: Renaud in Armide by Lully
 1686; Acis in Acis et Galatée by Lully
 1687: Achille in Achille et Polyxène by Lully and Collasse
 1689: Pélée in Thétis et Pélée by Collasse
 1690: Énée in Énée et Lavinie by Collasse
 1693: Énée in Didon by Henri Desmarets
 1693: Jason in Médée by Marc-Antoine Charpentier
 1697: Octavio in L'Europe galante by André Campra
 1697: Philémon in Issé by Destouches
 1697: Adonis in Vénus et Adonis by Henri Desmarets
 1699: in Amadis de Grèce by Destouches

References

 Weller, Philip (1992), 'Dumesnil' in The New Grove Dictionary of Opera, ed. Stanley Sadie (London) 
 Le guide de l'opéra, les indispensables de la musique, R.Mancini & J.J.Rouvereux, (Fayard, 1986), 

French operatic tenors
1702 deaths
Year of birth unknown
17th-century French male opera singers